The Balkanstreitkräfte (German for Balkan Armed Forces), also known as the Balkan Army, was the force raised by Austria-Hungary for its offensive action against Serbia in August 1914, at the start of the First World War.

After three failed invasions of Serbia, the Balkanstreitkräfte was decisively defeated by the army of the small Balkan kingdom, a spectacular humiliation for the Habsburg monarchy which resulted in the resignation in disgrace of the Balkan Army's commander General Oskar Potiorek on 27 December 1914. The Balkanstreitkräfte was officially disbanded in May 1915 with the remaining 5th Army reorganised by Archduke Eugen and relocated to the Italian front.

Formation and organisation

A total of seven of the Austro-Hungarian army sixteen corps were therefore dedicated to attack Serbia. On 28 July 1914 Austria–Hungary officially declared war against Serbia, Conrad immediately instructed both Minimalgruppe Balkan and B-Staffel to move south raising the strength to twenty six divisions after ordering III Corps, part of A-Staffel to join with B-Staffel. The forces sent against Serbia represented at that moment half of the Austro-Hungarian army strength.

On 7 August 1914 Balkanstreitkräfte was placed under the command of Bosnia-Herzegovina’s military governor Oskar Potiorek, by the chief of the Austro-Hungarian General Staff, Franz Conrad von Hötzendorf. Aside from the supreme command of the Balkan Forces, Potiorek also commanded the 6th Army.

The four corps of B-Staffel and the three corps of Minimalgruppe Balkan, some 19 infantry divisions in all, assigned to the Balkan front were:
B-Staffel:
2nd Army under Eduard von Böhm-Ermolli
IV (Budapest),
VII (Temesvár)
IX (Leitmeritz)
Minimalgruppe Balkan:
5th Army under Liborius Ritter von Frank
VIII (Prag)
XIII (Zagreb (Agram))
6th Army under Oskar Potiorek
XV (Sarajevo) 
XVI (Ragusa)

Operational history

Serbia

At the start of the campaign, in August 1914, Balkanstreitkräfte's operational forces totalled 319½ infantry battalions (approximately 320,000 rifles), sixty cavalry squadrons, 744 cannons, 48 aircraft and 486 machine guns, while Serbia 250,000-strong operational army was woefully equipped with 200 machine guns, three aircraft and 180,000 modern rifles.

The invasion plan was using the 5th and 6th Armies to attack from the west while elements of the 2nd Army, penetrating from the northwest corners of Serbia, join in and lock down the Serb forces in a quick, decisive battle. On 28 July, the bombardment of Belgrade started followed by the first invasion on 12 August. By 18 August, the 2nd Army minus the 8th Corps was redeployed to join the Battle of Galicia and fight the Russian Army while the 5th Army, unprepared for mountain warfare, struggled to bridge the Drina River and staying in touch with the 6th Army to the south. By contrast, the Serbian Army was clearly prepared and skilfully drew the Habsburg forces deep into Serbia, fighting each armies individually defeating the 5th Army at the Battle of Cer on 20 August. Before the end of the Summer all Balkanstreitkräfte's units had retreated out of Serbia, the first Allied victory of the First World War On 8 September Potiorek launched a second invasion threatening Belgrade, however at the Battle of the Drina the 5th Army was pushed back into Bosnia while the 6th was also force to retreat on 25 September to avoid encirclement from Serbian and Montenegrin forces. 

Starting on 24 October, the Valjevo offensive enjoyed some success allowing the Balkan Army to reach deep into northern Serbia. At the beginning of November the Austro-Hungarians using their artillery superiority forced the Serbs to retreat. On 2 December the Fifith army managed to capture Belgrade, a few days later a spectacular Serbian counteroffensive at the Battle of Kolubara forced the Austro-Hungarian Sixth Army to retreat back into Syrmia in complete disarray. The Serbs then turned their forces against the Fifth Army, which was driven back to Western Banat under the Serbian onslaught. In the face of total annihilation the Balkanstreitkräfte was forced to evacuate Serbia yet again abandoning Belgrade which was recaptured by the Serbs on 15 December.

Disbandment
By the end of December 1914, Balkanstreitkräfte losses reached 274,000 with almost 30,000 killed, over 122,000 wounded, and 75,000 missing or captured. Losses were so heavy that the Sixth Army was dissolved, and its remnants were subsumed into the Fifth Army. On 17 December 1914, General Oskar Potiorek, was relieved of command resigning a few days later. General der Kavallerie Archduke Eugen assumed command of the remaining 5th Army. On 27 May 1915 it was relocated to the Isonzo front.

Army commanders

See also
 Austro-Hungarian first occupation of Serbia

Notes

References

Sources

External links
 Organisation and Command of the Austro-Hungarian Army
 Order of Battle Balkanstreitkräfte August, 1914 

Army units and formations of Austria-Hungary in World War I
1914 establishments in Austria-Hungary
1915 disestablishments in Austria-Hungary
Military units and formations established in 1914
Military units and formations disestablished in 1915
Army groups of Austria-Hungary